Gary M. Gordon (born June 10, 1957) is a Canadian Roman Catholic bishop. Ordained to the priesthood on May 22, 1982, Gordon was named bishop of the Roman Catholic Diocese of Whitehorse, Canada in early 2006.

Early life
Born on June 10, 1957, at St. Paul's Hospital, Vancouver, British Columbia, and raised in Burnaby, Gordon studied at the Seminary of Christ the King, Mission, B.C.; at St. Jerome College, University of Waterloo, Ontario; and at St. Peter's Seminary, London, Ontario. He was ordained to the priesthood on May 22, 1982, for the Archdiocese of Vancouver, and served several parishes throughout British Columbia, including Vancouver, Chilliwack and Mission. He spent most of his time as a diocesan priest working with First Nations People.

Gordon also served as the Pacific regional representative of the Canadian Conference of Catholic Bishops (CCCB) with the Interfaith Committee on Chaplaincy of the Correctional Service of Canada (1994-2006), and was the CCCB principal liaison and spokesperson on the Interfaith Committee (2002-2006).

Bishop
Gordon was named Bishop of Whitehorse on January 5, 2006. Since 2007, Gordon has been the CCCB Bishop ponens for Catholics involved in prison chaplaincy and pastoral services.

In addition, he has been Chairman of the CCCB Standing Committee for Relations with Movements and Associations since 2011, after previously serving on the former Episcopal Commission for Relations with Associations of Clergy, Consecrated Life and Laity (2007-2008). He has been a member of the Anglican/Roman Catholic Bishops' Dialogue since 2007, and became its Co-Chairman in 2009.

On Saturday, June 14, 2014, Pope Francis named Gary Gordon as Bishop of Victoria. At the time of his appointment, he was Bishop of Whitehorse, Yukon. Bishop Gordon succeeded Bishop Richard Gagnon, who was appointed Archbishop of Winnipeg on October 28, 2013. Gagnon served as Apostolic Administrator of Victoria until he was installed as Archbishop of Winnipeg on January 3, 2014. Until Bishop Gordon's installation, John Laszczyk was Diocesan Administrator of Victoria. (Canadian Conference of Catholic Bishops)

Installation Mass for Bishop Gordon was held on Thursday, August 28, 2014 at St. Andrew's Cathedral in downtown Victoria. Over 50 priests and many bishops from across the country and especially Western Canada were present.  Archbishop Michael Miller of Vancouver and Archbishop Luigi Bonazzi, the Apostolic Nuncio, also attended.

References

1957 births
Living people
People from Burnaby
21st-century Roman Catholic bishops in Canada
St. Peter's Seminary (Diocese of London, Ontario) alumni
Roman Catholic bishops of Victoria in Canada
Roman Catholic bishops of Whitehorse